Carmelo Chionglo  (July 16, 1946 – September 21, 2019), better known as Mel Chionglo, was a Filipino film director and production designer. He has directed more than 40 films since 1981.

From 1966 to 1976, he worked and studied acting and directing at the New York Academy of Theatrical Arts. Returning to Manila, he worked as production designer. His directorial debut was Regal Films' Playgirl (1981).

He was one of the founding members of the Directors’ Guild of the Philippines Inc. He also served as board member on the Movie and Television Review and Classification Board.

Career
Chionglo began working in the film industry as production designer on such films as Mike de Leon's The Rites of May, Lino Brocka's Mother, Sister, Daughter, and Eddie Romero's Aguila.

He directed Playgirl, his first film, in 1981. It was scripted by Ricardo Lee and starred Gina Alajar. 

He also directed Midnight Dancers, Burlesk King, Iadya Mo Kami, Lauriana, and Nasaan Ka Nang Kailangan Kita. Burlesk King was screened at the 2000 Berlin International Film Festival.

Filmography
 Itim (Rites of May) (1976) (production designer)
 Salawahan (1979) (production designer)
 Temptation Island (1980) (production designer)
 Aguila (1980) (art director)
 Playgirl (1981) (director); starring Gina Alajar
 Sibak: Midnight Dancers (1994) (director)
 Lagarista (2000) (director); starring Piolo Pascual
 Burlesk King (1999) (director)
 Lucia (1992) (director); written by Lino Brocka; starring Lolita Rodriguez and Gina Alajar

References

External links
 

1946 births
2019 deaths
Filipino film directors
People from Lucena, Philippines